The Mannai Express is an express train operated by the Southern Railway zone of the Indian Railways. This train connects Chennai Egmore and Mannargudi via Villupuram, Mayiladuthurai and Thiruvarur in the Indian state of Tamil Nadu. The traffic was opened in 2011.

History
But this train is rerouted via Nidamangalam Junction, Mayiladuthurai Junction and continues till Chennai Egmore via the old existing route. Indian Railways had taken this decision due to some technical reasons caused by this train. But people from Kumbakonam, Thanjavur, started opposing railways decision. But this train is diverted via Thiruvarur Junction during mid of 2017 in the month of March after a long demand from the Thiruvarur and Cauvery Delta district peoples. The technical reasons railways quoted are:

 This train causes 2 loco reversals (one at Nidamangalam Junction and another at Thanjavur Junction) which causes more technical difficulties and loss of time and fuel.
while operating this train in the newly diverted route, it can over come those loco reversal problems and it is a shorter distance for Mannargudi when compared with the old route.

Route and halts 
This train is being operated via the main line and hauled by an electric locomotive from Chennai Egmore to Mannargudi.

Schedule

Coach composition
The Mannai Express runs between Chennai Egmore and Mannargudi has a rake sharing agreement (RSA) with Chendur Express between Chennai and Tiruchendur. These two rakes are used for operating Mannargudi – Mayiladuthurai – Mannargudi (06403 / 06404) and Tiruchendur – Tirunelveli – Tiruchendur (06405/ 06406) passenger trains.

It has one AC First Class, one Ac Two Tier, one AC Three Tier, nine Sleeper class, four Unreserved general sitting coach.

References

External links
 16179 Mannai Express
 16180 Mannai Express

Named passenger trains of India
Rail transport in Tamil Nadu
Railway services introduced in 2011
Transport in Chennai
Transport in Mannargudi
Express trains in India